This page documents the tornadoes and tornado outbreaks of 1985, primarily in the United States. Most tornadoes form in the U.S., although some events may take place internationally. Tornado statistics for older years like this often appear significantly lower than modern years due to fewer reports or confirmed tornadoes.

Synopsis

The tornado season of 1985 saw very little action in the winter months, and even the spring wasn't particularly notable until the massive May 31 outbreak, one of the most intense and deadliest in modern American history, which saw 44 tornadoes kill 88 people in Ohio, Pennsylvania, New York and Ontario, Canada. Eight of 1985's ten F4 tornadoes and the one F5 tornado happened during this outbreak.

Events
Confirmed tornado total for the entire year 1985 in the United States.

January
There were 2 tornadoes confirmed in the US in January.

February
There were 7 tornadoes confirmed in the US in February.

March
There were 38 tornadoes confirmed in the US in March.

March 11
An F2 tornado hit Hollister, California causing no injuries.

March 17
An F3 tornado killed two in Sarasota County, Florida.

April
There were 134 tornadoes confirmed in the US in April.

April 21–23 
An F3 tornado in Texas resulted in three fatalities. Another notable storm from this event includes an F3 tornado that started about 4 miles northeast of Ida, Louisiana, moving into Arkansas, where it mainly dealt F1 damage in wooded areas. The tornadoes were part of a large outbreak that spawned over 30 tornadoes.

April 29
A low-end F2 tornado touched down in the Ardmore, Oklahoma area. This tornado is notable due to the TOtable Tornado Observatory getting its closest to a tornado, being sideswiped by the edge of the storm. This storm brought the realization that TOTO had a center of gravity too high for extreme wind, resulting in it falling down when it got sideswiped.

May
There were 182 tornadoes confirmed in the US in May.

May 10

An outbreak of tornadoes occurred in Kansas and Nebraska. One of the notable F4 tornadoes was the Agra Tornado, touched down in Phillips County, Kansas, near the city of Agra. The tornado then crossed into Nebraska travelling through Franklin, and Webster Counties. The tornado varied in width throughout its life, ranging from 200-1000 yards, Agra resident Bob Scales took images for of the tornado over a 20 minute period, showing the tornado go from a large wedge, to a stovepipe tornado.

May 31

A major tornado outbreak occurred in Ohio, Pennsylvania, New York, and Ontario on the last day of May. 44 tornadoes were confirmed, including 14 in Ontario. It is the largest and most intense tornado outbreak ever to hit this region. 90 people were killed and nine tornadoes were F4 or stronger, including the F5 Niles-Wheatland tornado.

Areas with the most devastation and deaths were Wheatland, Atlantic, and Albion, Pennsylvania.  Yourga Trucking in Wheatland was hit beyond recognition in addition to the Amish community in Atlantic.   Wheatland had 310 injuries and 18 fatalities while Atlantic had 125 and 16.

June
There were 82 tornadoes confirmed in the US in June.

June 8
Tornadoes killed two in Wisconsin and one in Michigan.

July
There were 51 tornadoes confirmed in the US in July.

July 25

An F3 tornado spawned by Hurricane Bob briefly touched down near the Albemarle County and Greene County line, hitting a grocery store and a subdivision, causing no deaths or injuries.

August
There were 108 tornadoes confirmed in the US in August.

August 16

An F3 tornado spawned by Hurricane Danny struck Waco, Tennessee, and produced a damage swath that was 500 yards wide.

September
There were 40 tornadoes confirmed in the US in September.

October
There were 18 tornadoes confirmed in the US in October.

November
There were 19 tornadoes confirmed in the US in November.

November 18
An F3 tornado killed three in Arkansas.

December
There were 3 tornadoes confirmed in the US in December.

See also
 Tornado
 Tornadoes by year
 Tornado records
 Tornado climatology
 Tornado myths
 List of tornado outbreaks
 List of F5 and EF5 tornadoes
 List of North American tornadoes and tornado outbreaks
 List of 21st-century Canadian tornadoes and tornado outbreaks
 List of European tornadoes and tornado outbreaks
 List of tornadoes and tornado outbreaks in Asia
 List of Southern Hemisphere tornadoes and tornado outbreaks
 List of tornadoes striking downtown areas
 Tornado intensity
 Fujita scale
 Enhanced Fujita scale

References

External links
 U.S. tornadoes in 1985 - Tornado History Project
 Tornado deaths monthly

 
1985 meteorology
Tornado-related lists by year
Torn